The Ligue 1 relegation/promotion playoffs is an annual playoff fixture in French football contested by the 18th-placed team in Ligue 1 and the winner of the Ligue 2 promotion play-offs. It takes place after the completion of the regular season and is administered by Ligue de Football Professionnel. Play-offs are a two-legged tie and the winner is decided by aggregate score. Play-offs were introduced in the 2016–17 season, even though similar play-offs were played until 1993 when Ligue 1 was named Division 1. The first leg of play-offs are played on the home ground of the Ligue 2 club with the return leg at the home of the Ligue 1 club.

Results

2016–17 season

Troyes won 2–1 on aggregate and were promoted to 2017–18 Ligue 1; Lorient were relegated to 2017–18 Ligue 2.

2017–18 season

Toulouse won 4–0 on aggregate and therefore both clubs remained in their respective leagues.

2018–19 season

Dijon won 4–2 on aggregate and therefore both clubs remained in their respective leagues.

2019–20 season

League was suspended in March 2020 due to COVID-19 pandemic in France. No playoffs were played. The teams in the play-off positions at the time of suspension (Nîmes from Ligue 1 and Ajaccio from Ligue 2) remained in their respective leagues.

2020–21 season

The 2020–21 season ended with a relegation play-off between the 18th-placed Ligue 1 team, Nantes, and the winner of the semi-final of the Ligue 2 play-off, Toulouse, on a two-legged confrontation.

1st leg

2nd leg

2–2 on aggregate. Nantes won on away goals and therefore both clubs remained in their respective leagues.

2021–22 season

The 2021–22 season ended with a relegation play-off between the 18th-placed Ligue 1 team, Saint-Étienne, and the winner of the semi-final of the Ligue 2 play-off, Auxerre, on a two-legged confrontation.

1st leg

2nd leg

2–2 on aggregate. Auxerre won 5–4 on penalties and were promoted to 2022–23 Ligue 1; Saint-Étienne were relegated to 2022–23 Ligue 2.

References

Football leagues in France
relegation
relegation